Dendrophthoe lanosa is a species of mistletoe in the family Loranthaceae; no subspecies are listed in the Catalogue of Life.  Records are from Indo-China and Malesia; in Vietnam it may be called mộc ký Xiêm.

References

External links
 

Dendrophthoe
Flora of Indo-China
Flora of Malesia